Mustafa Celalettin Pasha, born as Konstanty Borzęcki (April 10, 1826 in Modrzewiec, Piotrków County – 1876 in Novoselë, Kolonjë), was a participant in Polish and Ottoman uprisings, a strategist, and a writer.
He was the great-grandfather of Nâzım Hikmet and Oktay Rıfat Horozcu.

He participated in the Greater Poland Uprising (1848) (Poznań uprising against the Prussians) and the Hungarian revolution in 1848-1849 (the Polish Legion fought in Hungary during the war). After the fall of the uprising, he emigrated to the Ottoman Empire, where he enlisted in the army. There he adopted a new name, Mustafa Celalettin Pasha, and was circumcised and converted to Islam in 1849. He married Saffet Khanum, a daughter of Omer Pasha, a native Serbian who converted to Islam; they had one son, Hasan Enver Pasha.

In the Ottoman Empire he became famous on the battlefield in numerous wars from 1852 on. He was captain of the Ottoman General Staff and the chief of the department of cartography, and received the rank of Major General.

He was killed in the war with Montenegro. His body was placed in a mosque in Albania, where he was buried as a Ottoman hero.

References

Polish Muslims
Islam in Poland
Turkish Muslims
1826 births
1876 deaths
19th-century Ottoman military personnel
Pashas
Polish emigrants to the Ottoman Empire